Parazercon is a genus of mites in the family Zerconidae. There are at least four described species in Parazercon.

Species
These four species belong to the genus Parazercon:
 Parazercon belunensis Lombardini, 1962
 Parazercon mirabilis Ujvari, 2011
 Parazercon radiatus (A.Berlese, 1910)
 Parazercon sarekensis C.Willmann, 1939

References

Zerconidae
Articles created by Qbugbot